Ralph Douglas Charles "Challe" Berglund (born 18 January 1965 in Stockholm, Sweden) is a Swedish former ice hockey player and coach.

Biography
He played 12 seasons for Djurgårdens IF of the Elitserien and won five Swedish Championships with Djurgården in 1989, 1990, 1991, 2000 and 2001. He also received silver in 1992 and 1998. The last seasons of his career he was the team captain. He is highly appreciated and loved by the supporters of Djurgården (i.e. Järnkaminerna) for being so devoted to the club and its supporters.

Berglund earned 142 caps for the Swedish national team. He won both the World Championship gold in 1991 and the Olympic gold in 1994. In 1996, he also won the Swiss Championship with EHC Kloten.

Berglund has also been appearing on Swedish TV4 as an expert commentator for harness racing, which is also his favorite hobby.

Berglund has been coaching Djurgårdens IF, Timrå IK and Modo Hockey of the Elitserien. He coached Djurgården for two seasons before leaving the team in 2007 to coach Timrå. He coached Timrå for three seasons before leaving the team in 2010 to coach Modo. Berglund was forced to leave Modo in 2011 after only one season, mainly because the team finished 12th in Elitserien and therefore had to play in the 2011 Kvalserien to remain in Elitserien.

Berglund's No. 2 Djurgården jersey was retired and raised to the rafters at Hovet on 24 January 2012, prior to a home game against Färjestad BK which Djurgården won 2–1 after a shootout.

On 12 May 2011, Berglund said in an interview that he would take a one-year break from coaching, after declining an offer from IF Sundsvall Hockey. On 6 August 2011, Berglund signed with the sports channel Viasat Hockey as a color commentator for HockeyAllsvenskan and Kvalserien. Berglund cancelled his contract with Viasat on 6 March 2012, as Djurgården were forced to play in the 2012 Kvalserien. As a result, Djurgården called Berglund up as the team's new head coach to help save them in the highest division. Although the team was relegated to HockeyAllsvenskan, the plan was for Berglund to remain as head coach for the team throughout the 2013–14 season, and also to work as General Manager for Djurgården. However, after weak results Berglund stepped down as head coach in November 2012, remaining as General Manager for two more years until August 2014.

Clubs
 Djurgårdens IF juniors, 1982–1984
 Huddinge IK (1984–1986)
 Nacka HK (1986–1987)
 Djurgårdens IF (1987–1995)
 EHC Kloten (1995–1997)
 Djurgårdens IF (1997–2001)

Coaching career
 Väsby IK Hockey (2004–2005)
 Djurgårdens IF (2005–2007) (assisting coach)
 Timrå IK (2007–2010)
 Modo Hockey (2010–2011)
 Djurgårdens IF (2012–) (head coach and general manager)

Medals
 Olympic gold 1994
 WC gold 1991
 WC silver 1993, 1995
 WC bronze 1994
 Swedish Champion in 1989, 1990, 1991, 2000, 2001
 Canada Cup, 3rd 1991
 Europateamcup gold 1991, 1992
 Swiss gold 1996

Career statistics

Regular season and playoffs

International

References

External links
 

1965 births
Living people
Djurgårdens IF Hockey players
Huddinge IK players
Ice hockey players at the 1992 Winter Olympics
Ice hockey players at the 1994 Winter Olympics
EHC Kloten players
Medalists at the 1994 Winter Olympics
Nacka HK players
Olympic gold medalists for Sweden
Olympic ice hockey players of Sweden
Olympic medalists in ice hockey
Ice hockey people from Stockholm
Swedish expatriate sportspeople in Switzerland
Swedish ice hockey coaches
Swedish ice hockey centres
Djurgårdens IF Hockey coaches